MS GNV Azzurra is a cruiseferry owned by the Mediterranean Shipping Company and operated by the Italy-based SNAV. It was ordered from Öresundsvarvet in Landskrona, Sweden by Rederi AB Gotland as MS Gotland, but delivered as MS Wasa Star to Vaasanlaivat / Vasabåtarna. Between 1984 and 2008 she sailed as MS Peter Wessel for Larvik Line (until 1996) and Color Line, before sold to her current owners.

Concept and construction

In the late 1970s the Swedish shipbuilding industry was suffering from a downturn, with little to no ships in order from Swedish shipyards. To help the industry the Swedish Prime Minister Ola Ullsten persuaded Rederi AB Gotland to order new ferries from Öresundsvarvet in Landskrona. Although Rederi AB Gotland were reluctant to order new ships at first, in the end they decided to order two large, state-of-the-art ferries, capable of carrying over 2000 passengers. The first ship, MS Visby, was delivered on 10 October 1980. The second ship, planned to be called MS Gotland, was delivered on 24 June 1981 to Rederi Ab Gotland. However, there were not enough passengers in the traffic from Gotland to the Swedish mainland, on one day following her delivery the ship was chartered to Vaasanlaivat / Vasabåtarna, Finland and officially named MS Wasa Star.

Service history

1981–1983: Vaasanlaivat and Karageorgios Line

On 1 July 1981 the brand new Wasa Star started traffic on the route connecting Vaasa in Finland to Sundsvall in Sweden. At the time she was by far the largest ferry to have ever sailed in the Kvarken. In February 1982 the ship was moved to the Vaasa – Umeå route. On 14 February 1981 the ship was grounded near Holmsund. She soon came loose but her tanks were damaged, and the ship sailed to Helsinki for repairs. The local shipyard did not have a free drydock for the repairs and on 16 February 1981 the Wasa Star continued from Helsinki to Kiel, Germany where she was finally repaired at Howaldtswerke-Deutsche Werft.

On 1 April 1982 the Wasa Star returned to the Vaasa – Sundsvall route. She was not profitable however, and on 31 August 1982 she was taken out of traffic and laid up in Sundsvall. There she remained until May 1983, when Vaasanlaivat sub-chartered her to Karageorgios Line, Greece and she left Sundsvall for Valletta, Malta where she was docked in preparation for her new service. In June she started trafficking on a route connecting Patras, Greece to Ancona, Italy with one weekly trip from Ancona to Igoumenitsa, Greece. However, due to a payment dispute between Vaasanlaivat and Karageorgios Line Wasa Stars service in the Mediterranean remained short, and she sailed to Landskrona, Sweden to be laid up.

1983–1996: Larvik Line

On 29 August 1983, after the various conflicting charter agreements were resolved, the Wasa Star was sold to the Norwegian operator Larvik Line. She left Landskrona on 13 January 1984. In March of the same year she was renamed MS Peter Wessel, after Peter Wessel Tordenskiold and started operating on the Larvik–Frederikshavn route.

The Peter Wessel collided with MS Sydfjord on 27 June 1986. the Sydfjord sunk following the collision, and 3 of her crew were evacuated on board the Peter Wessel, among the dead was the captain and his family.

Peter Wessel was extended by  meters at Blohm + Voss, Hamburg, Germany in 1988. Additional cabins were also built on the top of the ship.

1996–2008: Color Line

In October 1996 Color Line chartered the Peter Wessel from Larvik Line, keeping her on the same route as before. In 1999 parts of the cardeck were built in with cabins, decreasing her car capacity. In spring 2003 the ship was rebuilt again, this time at Remontowa, Poland with large side sponsons for increased stabity. In 2004 Color Line bought the Peter Wessel from Larvik Line.

In April 2006 the ship was transferred to the Larvik—Hirtshals route. On 22 March 2007 a fire broke out in one of the ship's electric switchboards, which forced her to sail to Frederikshavn. Due to repairs the ship was forced to stay out of service for over a month, returning to service on 26 April 2007.

On 19 October 2007 Color Line reported that the Peter Wessel has been sold to Mediterranean Shipping Company, to be delivered after the delivery of the new  in April–May 2008. The Peter Wessel was delivered to her new owners on 16 April 2008 and subsequently renamed MS SNAV Toscana.

2008 onwards: SNAV-GNV

On 19 April 2008 the SNAV Toscana left Norway for the Mediterranean. She entered service on SNAV's Civitavecchia—Palermo or Civitavecchia – Olbia service during 2008. Now the ship services Genova – Porto Torres route. Since 2017, SNAV Toscana was renamed as GNV Azzurra.

References

External links 
 

Cruiseferries
Ships built in Landskrona
1980 ships
Former Color Line ships